Streams is a 1999 album by various artists in the contemporary Christian music genre. Streams is a loose concept album focusing on the themes of pain and healing. In addition to the vocalists, the Irish Film Orchestra contributes instrumental scores to the album.

Track listing
 "Job" (Cindy Morgan, Loren Balman) – 5:04; performed by Cindy Morgan
 "Don't Give Up" (Peter Gabriel) – 6:52; performed by Maire Brennan and Michael McDonald
 "Breathe" (Leigh Nash) – 4:03; performed by Sixpence None the Richer
 "Sanctuary" (Balman, Mark Harris, Michael W. Smith) – 4:32; performed by Chris Rodriguez 
 "Hold On" (Brent Bourgeois, Morgan) – 4:25; performed by Michelle Tumes 
 "The Only Thing I Need" (Bourgeois) – 5:01; performed by 4Him and Jon Anderson 
 "Find Me In the River" – (Martin Smith) – 5:48; performed by Delirious? and Amy Grant
 "I Will Rest In You" (Bourgeois, Tumes) – 5:11; performed by Jaci Velasquez
 "From Above" (Steven Delopoulos) – 5:15; performed by Burlap to Cashmere
 "Forever On and On" (Gordon Kennedy, Jimmie Lee Sloas) – 5:29; performed by Point of Grace
 "Orchestral Suite: For Cova" (Morgan, Carl Marsh) – 5:16; performed by The Irish Film Orchestra
 "Orchestral Suite: Abigail" (Marsh, Michael W. Smith) – 4:43; performed by The Irish Film Orchestra
 "Orchestral Suite: Delaney McDowell" (Marsh, Martin Smith) – 5:02; performed by The Irish Film Orchestra
 "Orchestral Suite: Streams (for John Cole)" (Marsh, Morgan) – 5:48; performed by The Irish Film Orchestra

Personnel
 Matt Rollings – piano (1, 14)
 Brent Bourgeois – keyboards (2, 5, 6, 8), backing vocals (2, 4, 5), piano (3, 10, 13), arrangements (13)
 Michael W. Smith – keyboards (4), programming (4), loops (4)
 Kent Hooper – additional keyboards (5, 8)
 Tim Jupp –  keyboards (7)
 Tedd T – programming (7)
 Michael Quinlan – additional programming (7)
 Josh Zandman – piano (9)
 Phil Madeira – Hammond B3 organ (10)
 Robin Crow – acoustic guitar (2, 6, 8, 13)
 Chris Rodriguez – electric guitar (2, 4, 5, 6, 8, 9), backing vocals (4)
 Matt Slocum – electric guitar (3)
 Stuart Garrard – electric guitar (7)
 Martin Smith – electric guitar (7), lead vocals (7)
 Steve Delopoulos – acoustic guitar (9), lead vocals (9)
 Johnny Philippides – acoustic guitar (9), backing vocals (9)
 Tom Hemby – acoustic guitar (10)
 Gordon Kennedy – acoustic guitar (10), electric guitar (10)
 Phil Keaggy – Ebow (13)
 Larry Tagg – bass (2, 5, 6, 8)
 Justin Cary – bass (3)
 Jimmie Lee Sloas – bass (4, 10)
 Jon Thatcher – bass (7)
 Craig Young – bass (9)
 Chris McHugh – drums (2, 4, 5, 6, 8)
 Dale Baker – drums (3)
 Stewart Smith – drums (7), percussion (7)
 Aaron Smith – drums (9)
 Steve Brewster – drums (10)
 Eric Darken – percussion (2, 3, 5, 6, 8–11, 13)
 Davy Spillane – Uilleann pipes (2, 9, 13), low whistle (2, 9, 13)
 Carl Marsh – arrangements and conductor (11–14)
 Caitriona Walsh – string contractor
 The Irish Film Orchestra – strings
 Maire Brennan – backing vocals (2, 11, 13)
 Leigh Nash – lead vocals (3)
 Michelle Tumes – backing vocals (3–6, 8, 13)
 Shelley Breen – backing vocals (5, 8)

Production
 Brent Bourgeois – producer
 Delirious? – producer (7)
 Lynn Nichols – producer (7)
 Brown Bannister – producer (10)
 Loren Balman – co-producer, executive producer 
 Linda Bourne Wornell – A&R coordinator
 David Schober – engineer (1–9, 11–14)
 Steve Bishir – engineer (10)
 Julian Kindred – additional engineer
 Jim McCaslin – additional engineer
 Mike Elsner – additional string engineer
 Rob Evans – additional string engineer
 David Rand Martin – additional string engineer
 Darren Moran – additional string engineer
 Greg Parker – additional string engineer
 David Schober – mixing
 Dark Horse Recording Studio, Franklin, Tennessee – recording studio (1–6, 8, 9, 11–14)
 Ocean Way Recording, Hollywood, California – recording studio (7)
 Sound Emporium, Nashville, Tennessee – recording studio (10)
 Antenna Studios, Franklin, Tennessee – additional recording location
 Windmill Lane Studios, Dublin, Ireland – string recording location
 Dark Horse Recording – mixing location
 Doug Sax – mastering at The Mastering Lab (Hollywood, California)
 Loren Balman – art direction
 Chuck Hargett – art direction, design
 Robert M. Ascroft – talent photography 
 Loren Balman – cover and streams photography
 Robin Geary – hair and make-up
 Tracy Kujawa – styling

References

Contemporary Christian music compilation albums
1999 compilation albums